Thomas John Burgh (6 May 1786 – 4 September 1845) was an Irish cleric who was Dean of Cloyne from 1823 until his death on 4 September 1845.

Burgh was born in County Kildare and was educated at Trinity College, Dublin. After a curacy in Letterkenny, he served incumbencies at Kilbixy and Ballinrobe. He died at Naas in 1845.

References

Alumni of Trinity College Dublin
Irish Anglicans
Deans of Cloyne
1845 deaths
People from County Kildare
1786 births